Chesterville is an unincorporated community in eastern Colorado County, in the U.S. state of Texas. It is located in a farming region northeast of Eagle Lake at the junction of Farm to Market Road 1093 (FM 1093) and Farm to Market Road 2764 (FM 2764). A large grain storage facility is a significant landmark in the area.

Geography
The small community of Chesterville is situated in extreme eastern Colorado County. In fact, FM 2764 runs along the boundary line with Wharton County except in the short distance where it curves north to meet FM 1093 at right angles at Chesterville. Middle Bernard Creek flows to the east of the community.

History
In 1894, John Linderholm of Chicago bought 60,000 acres of land in the area for his Southern Texas Colonization Company. Linderholm's efforts to promote settlement were successful and people from the Midwest flocked to the area. In 1895 a post office was set up and the town was named after the land surveyor William P. Chester. Soon there were between 150 and 200 persons living in a community served by a school, 20 businesses and several churches. However, it was soon found that the land was more suited to large-scale rice growing and cattle-raising than for small-scale farming. By 1914 the population fell to 75 and shrank further to 25 by 1933. The post office closed in 1950 while the population of 25 held steady through 1966. One rice business remained in the area by the 1980s. About 50 persons lived in the area in 2000.

References

See also

Unincorporated communities in Colorado County, Texas
Unincorporated communities in Texas